Hockley is an unincorporated community located in Harris County, Texas, on Texas State Highway 6 and U.S. Highway 290, about five miles southeast of the city hall of Waller, and   northwest of downtown Houston.

The community serves as the main hub for railway traffic serving Houston, Austin, and many parts of Central Texas. The Southern Pacific (now known as Union Pacific) rail line is one of the community's major employers. The community is surrounded by grain farms and cattle ranches.  The ZIP Code for Hockley is 77447

History
George Washington Hockley established Hockley in 1835. In 1906, a salt dome was discovered near Hockley and mined, especially for salt.

Economy
In September 2008, Hewlett-Packard acquired  of land near Hockley in a proposed  industrial park planned by John Beeson of Beeson Properties and Monzer Hourani of Medistar Corp. It paid an undisclosed sum to Beeson and Hourani, the land's previous owners. Hewlett Packard's proposed $250 million facility would be near the intersection of Betka Road and U.S. Highway 290, in close proximity to the Harris County-Waller County line,  from HP's main greater Houston offices, and northwest of the city of Houston.

Infrastructure and government
Hockley is located in Harris County Precinct 3; as of 2008, Steve Radack serves as the head of the precinct.

The United States Postal Service operates the Hockley Post Office at 17210 Warren Ranch Road.

Parks and recreation
The county operates the Hockley Community Center at
28515 Old Washington Road. In 1982, the county bought  of land for a maintenance center and a community center. Bob Eckels, then the commissioner of Precinct 3, got a grant from the U.S. Department of Housing and Urban Development. Hermes Reed Hindman – Architects, Inc. developed the building and AIA Engineers and Contractors, Inc. served as the contractor. Construction ended in 1986.

The county operates Hockley Park at 28515 Old Washington Road at the community center site.

Education
Hockley is within the Waller Independent School District.

Schools serving Hockley include:
Waller High School (Unincorporated Harris County)
Waller Junior High School (Waller)
Wayne C. Schultz Junior High (Unincorporated Harris County)
Roberts Road Elementary School (Unincorporated Harris County)

Rosehill Christian School now located in the Rose Hill area, was first founded in Hockley in 1989.

Notable residents
Hockley is home to eight-time world-champion calf roper Fred Whitfield. He is the first African-American to win the world championship and was also named the PRCA All Around Champion in 1999. It is also the location of legendary racecar driver A. J. Foyt's ranch.

References

External links

Unincorporated communities in Texas
Unincorporated communities in Harris County, Texas
Populated coastal places in Texas
Greater Houston